Zev or Xev is a fictional character from the sci-fi television series Lexx. The character of Zev was portrayed by three actresses during the series' run and the character of Zev has had three incarnations. Zev's character was originally played by Lisa Hynes, after which she was portrayed by Eva Habermann and Xenia Seeberg. Habermann portrayed Zev for the first six episodes of the series, after which the character was renamed Xev and portrayed by Seeberg.

Background
The character was born on the planet B3K, where she was sold by her parents to the Wife Bank. During her initial years Zev was raised by computers that taught her to become a perfect wife. As a result, the character became overweight and was rejected by her bridegroom. Zev was then sentenced to become a love slave by being run through a device called the Lusticon, intended to transform her into a beautiful and brainless servant. Before the process could be successfully completed, a carnivorous reptile called a cluster lizard attempted to eat her but was fused to her DNA in the process. This enabled Zev to free herself. She then substituted the detached robot head of a 790 robot in the machine to be subjected to brainwashing. This prompted the robot to fall in love with her.

Zev's character died early in the second season in the episode "Terminal", but was re-animated in the next episode by the character Lyekka as a present for Stanley Tweedle. The character was renamed Xev (the pronunciation remaining the same) and was thereafter portrayed by a different actress, Xenia Seeberg. During the series' run the character has had feelings for Kai, which remained unrequited throughout the series. Seeberg has described the character as being one of the more moral characters of the show, but that her aspect as a potential love slave still factored heavily into the character's motivations.

Cluster lizard
As Zev and Xev, the character has the ability to transform into a cluster lizard and shares many similarities with the fictional creature. Cluster Lizards are portrayed as being very vicious reptilian creatures resembling centipedes that can curl up into a wheel-like shape and travel at considerable speeds. Otherwise they resemble by appearance a small Sandworm. They reproduce in mating cycles every seven years and are used as a form of capital punishment by His Divine Shadow.

In other media
An adult performer has been using the name Xev Bellringer since at least 2012.

References

Lexx
Science fiction television characters
Fictional shapeshifters